Jochen Kientz (born 17 September 1972) is a German former professional footballer who played as a centre-back.

Career
Born in Mannheim, Kientz played youth football at several clubs, including local VfR Mannheim and SV Waldhof Mannheim, but made his professional debuts with Eintracht Frankfurt, with whom he signed in January 1991; during the course of three Bundesliga seasons, he only made one league appearance and, in another winter transfer market move, in 1994, dropped down to the 2. Bundesliga and joined TSV 1860 Munich.

After only seven matches with the Lions, Kientz tried an abroad adventure, playing two seasons in Spain, one apiece with RCD Mallorca and CD Logroñés – the former in Segunda División where he appeared and scored regularly, the latter in La Liga, in a season which ended in relegation.

In the summer of 1997, Kientz returned to his country and to 1860 Munich, now in the top level, starting in one season and being backup in the other. He scored his first goal in the competition on 7 November 1998, albeit in a 3–1 derby loss against FC Bayern Munich.

After a very brief spell in Greece with Panionios FC, Kientz signed for Hamburger SV. At the Hanseatic club, he also appeared in the 2000–01 edition of the UEFA Champions League; during the competition, man-marking Zinedine Zidane in a home fixture, he was eventually headbutted by the French, who was sent off – the hosts won 3–1.

In 2001, Kientz joined neighbouring FC St. Pauli, being ejected from a game for the only time in his career, during a 2–0 loss at VfB Stuttgart, as his team eventually ranked last. After two injury-ravaged campaigns at F.C. Hansa Rostock (mainly ankle), he was forced to retire at the age of 32.

Post-retirement life
Subsequently, Kientz worked as a model for Amaze Models, owned by former Eintracht player Patrick Glöckner.

References

External links

Jochen Kientz at Eintracht archives 

1972 births
Living people
Footballers from Mannheim
German footballers
Association football defenders
Bundesliga players
2. Bundesliga players
La Liga players
Segunda División players
Super League Greece players
SV Sandhausen players
Eintracht Frankfurt players
Eintracht Frankfurt II players
TSV 1860 Munich players
Hamburger SV players
FC St. Pauli players
FC Hansa Rostock players
RCD Mallorca players
CD Logroñés footballers
Panionios F.C. players
Germany youth international footballers
German expatriate footballers
German expatriate sportspeople in Spain
Expatriate footballers in Spain
German expatriate sportspeople in Greece
Expatriate footballers in Greece